Ultuna is a locality in Uppsala Municipality, Uppsala County, Sweden with 449 inhabitants in 2017.

The name
The name, originally the name of an estate, is first recorded in 1221 ("in villa Wlertune"). The first element is the genitive case of the name of the Norse god Ullr. The last element is tuna 'enclosed field'.

References

Buildings and structures in Uppsala
Neighbourhoods of Uppsala